The Lost One is a 1951 West German drama film directed by Peter Lorre and starring Lorre, Karl John and Renate Mannhardt. It is an art film in the film noir style, based on a true story. Lorre wrote, directed, and starred in this film, his only film as director or writer. The film's translated name has been used as the title of his biography.

The film's sets were designed by the art director Franz Schroedter. Some scenes were shot at the Wandsbek Studios in Hamburg, while location shooting took place around the city.

Plot
The story is told through a series of flashbacks. Dr. Rothe (Peter Lorre) is a German scientist doing secret research for the Nazi government during World War II. After he discovers that his fiancée has been selling secrets to the Allies, he murders her. This is covered up by the German government. After the war, Rothe is working under an alias as a doctor for displaced persons. After seeing one of the Nazi officers who helped cover up his crime, Rothe is overcome by guilt about his wartime crimes.

Main cast
 Peter Lorre as Dr. Karl Rothe, alias Dr. Karl Neumeister
 Karl John as Hösch, alias Nowak
 Helmuth Rudolph as Colonel Winkler
 Johanna Hofer as Frau Hermann
 Renate Mannhardt as Inge Hermann
 Eva Ingeborg Scholz as Ursula Weber
 Lotte Rausch as Woman on Train
 Gisela Trowe as Prostitute
 Hansi Wendler as Rothe's Secretary
 Kurt Meister as Preefke
 Alexander Hunzinger as Drunk

Reception 
The film was unsuccessful with most of the German audiences in the 1950s, who tried to forget the Nazi era and preferred Heimatfilme. Der Verlorene has since achieved more recognition.

References

Further reading
 Article by Robert Keser
 Review in the New York Times

External links
 
 Peter Lorre and "Der Verlorene"

1951 films
1951 drama films
German black-and-white films
Film noir
Films about Nazi Germany
Films directed by Peter Lorre
German drama films
1950s German-language films
West German films
Films shot in Hamburg
Films set in Hamburg
Films set in the 1940s
Films shot at Wandsbek Studios
1950s German films